Poundland is a British variety store chain founded in 1990. It once sold most items at the single price of £1, including clearance items and proprietary brands. The first pilot store opened in December 1990 following numerous rejections by landlords who had reservations about allowing a single-price store to operate, fearing it could adversely affect the local competition. An estimated 7 million customers shopped in Poundland every week in 2016, many being female shoppers in the C1, C2, D and E categories (the working classes in a system of demographic classification used in the United Kingdom). Following a drop in share price of over 50%, Poundland was acquired in August 2016 by Steinhoff International for £610m.

The retailer expanded into other European countries during the latter half of 2011, first opening a store in the Republic of Ireland and later operating a subsidiary chain of discount stores in mainland Europe under the name Dealz. Poundland acquired closest rival 99p Stores in 2015, which left Poundworld as their closest competitor until it went bankrupt in 2018. Since August 2018, Poundland has been the category killer of the pound shop format in the United Kingdom.

Poundland opened their biggest retail store in February 2022, around three times the size of an average Poundland store, also selling a wider range of foodstuffs.

History

1990–1999: Formation and early history

Poundland was co-founded by Dave Dodd and father and son team Keith and Steven Smith in April 1990 with a starting capital of just £50,000 and an office in Sedgley. The firm was funded by a loan from Keith Smith, who had set up the wholesaler and discount store Hooty's in 1963. The first pilot shop opened in December 1990 in the Octagon Centre, Burton upon Trent and managed a turnover of £13,000 from 624 products on its first day of trading. Previous attempts at opening pilot shops had failed after being turned down by landlords who had reservations about allowing such a shop to operate and doubted the single-price concept would be successful in the UK.

By the end of the first year, Poundland was operating from several shops and had turned over £1 million, with a profit of £6,000. Growth continued throughout the early 1990s, with six shops by December 1991 and a further seven a year later. In 1995, Steven Smith failed to plan for more warehouse space and retail growth pushed their storage capacity past its limits. In response to unacceptably high stock theft, a new  warehouse was built, although it reduced profits from £850,000 in 1994 to £400,000 in 1995. Operational difficulties were resolved throughout 1996, when a new office in Hong Kong opened to support product sourcing and operations in the UK.

Early to mid-2000s: Expansion and management buyout

Although enduring a troubled first few years, by the 2000s Poundland had become a multimillion-pound business, opening their 150th shop in Northampton in mid-2006 with steady increases in gross turnover throughout the decade. Following a management buy-out in 2002 by Advent International for £50m, the company continued to grow with annual profit growth of 46% a year from £4.1m in 2006 to £12.7m in 2009. Chairman Colin Smith, speaking in April 2005 as Poundland revealed it had invested £20–25 million in building a  distribution centre, suggested there was great scope for further growth, saying "We can clearly conceive this chain having 400-plus stores in future"; this target was reached in 2012 with the opening of their Haringey store.

Late-2000s: Economic recession
Poundland reported strong sales in a time of economic crisis, with 2008–2009 revenue just short of £400m, up from £330m the previous year. Despite this, Poundland closed stores not financially viable, even if well-positioned, such as in West Ealing where it was believed that high rental costs were one of the reasons why the company pulled out of the area. Former CEO Jim McCarthy suggested there is a misconception that Poundland is a better business in a recession, saying that they are better during normal economic conditions, but robust enough to manage well under any economic conditions.

When the rate of VAT was reduced in November 2008 from 17.5% to 15%, Poundland's prices remained fixed at £1, having kept the single price of £1 for 18 years while absorbing duty and increased supplier costs, saying that savings would be passed on in other ways. Reports emerged in September 2008 that Poundland's owners, Advent International, were to put the retail chain up for sale, with figures showing that value retailers were seeing business boom during the economic recession, noting that value-conscious customers were switching from traditional larger supermarket retailers for everyday necessities. The retailer announced in 2010 a surge in sales by nearly 35% over the 2009–2010 festive period.

2010–2019
In early 2010, Poundland's owners Advent International were planning on cashing in on the resurgence in discount retailers by preparing to put the chain up for sale. The report came as figures showed that value retailers were seeing a business boom in the current economic climate, with Barclays Private Equity expressing an interest in a potential take-over of Poundland for about £200 million. On 4 May 2010, it was announced that Poundland had been sold to US private equity firm Warburg Pincus for £200 million and was the subject of an initial public offering in March 2014.

The company acquired 99p Stores in 2015, which was followed by a drop in its share price from 350p to 150p; in August 2016, the now-struggling Poundland was sold to the South African company Steinhoff International for £610 million. Poundland's shareholders approved the takeover in September 2016. The business converted the 99p Stores under the Poundland brand, and introducing 'Poundland & More', selling at a range of different prices, in the acquired stores.

In November 2017, Poundland signed a deal with British online shopping retailer musicMagpie to receive supplies of used CDs, DVDs and Blu-Rays, which are then sold for £1 as part of Poundland's Replay range.

Since 2020
In October 2020, Poundland announced they had purchased Frozen Value Ltd, a frozen food retailer known for the Fulton's Foods chain of convenience stores.

In 2021, Poundland introduced a new 'corner shop' convenience store format called Poundland Local, with a number of the acquired Fultons Foods shops being converted into the new format. Poundland Local would be first launched in the East Midlands and Yorkshire, with the stores selling a core range of everyday groceries, snacks and household products. The first Poundland Local opened in Kendray (near Barnsley) on 21 May 2021, with a second store opening the next day in Hornsea. Both stores were former Fultons Foods stores. In addition to Poundland Local, the firm also trialled a new store concept for railway stations and other transport hubs called Poundland Go!

In February 2022, Poundland opened their biggest retail store at Riverside Retail Park, Nottingham, in a former multi-outlet clothing store previously housing Dorothy Perkins, Topman, Topshop, Burton and Miss Selfridge, which closed following the collapse of parent Arcadia Group in 2020. The new Poundland outlet sells a wider range of foodstuffs including beer, wine and spirits, fresh fuit and vegetables in addition to chilled and frozen, which is planned to be rolled out to further stores during 2022.

Soon after, Poundland announced that a bigger new store opening was imminent, located at Stockton on Tees.

Business operations

Sales strategy

For much of its history, Poundland promoted their sales strategy through the slogan: "Yes, Everything's £1!", yet started selling items that cost more than £1 from the mid-2010s onwards; the Advertising Standards Authority received complaints that the slogan was thus misleading and required it ceased usage. There had been plans to expand the price offering in 2009 (such as a £2 section, 50p section etc.), but they were decided against at the time after understanding the overwhelming message from customers was not to change the easily understandable single price strategy.

For the majority of stock sold at £1, the company does not need to transmit pricing information to stores and associate price tags with each item. With some manufacturers being apprehensive about selling their brands in a discount environment, the store offers the alternative of selling the products under their own brand. Inflation can present challenges to single-price retailers as the primary marketing strategy requires products never to increase in price. However, inflation can also be to an advantage, as some products which may previously have retailed below £1 (therefore cheaper elsewhere) may then become better value for £1.

Problems arising from inflation are dismissed by Poundland, such as freight costs which become lower when the pound is weaker, in turn counteracting the impact. Various sales tactics are adopted to counteract inflation and reduce costs, including decreasing the quantity of an item within a set (such as removing a pencil within a larger pack) and replacing known brands with their own-brand alternatives. Examples of branded products being replaced include After Eights and Toblerone, both being confectionery products. Poundland's Toblerone replacement planned to launch in July 2017, by offering a closely resembling own-brand product named Twin Peaks, though following a legal battle from Toblerone's manufacturer, the product had to be redesigned to be distinctly different.

Products offered

Poundland offer approximately 3500 products, of which 1000 are branded, mostly food and drink. Stock typically is categorised as either ongoing core lines (products bought direct from the manufacturer), seasonal ranges or clearance stock, with 10,000 new products featured each year. Initially, unbranded products stocked by Poundland (accounting for roughly 70% of total stock) would carry the Poundland branding and logo, however the retailer determined it could increase sales by removing the Poundland branding and instead marketing their own sub-brand of products. Some of the products sold under the in-house brand are supplied by manufacturers who are worried about their brand being sold in discount stores and would rather allow their products to sell without their own branding attached.

As well as their in-house brand lines, the retailer sells many products from familiar brands, such as Colgate, Walkers and Cadbury. Poundland were reported to be Britain's largest seller of batteries in 2009, stocking brands such as Sony, Panasonic and Kodak in competitively priced quantities, with Kodak AA batteries being a high seller 2009. Poundland also sell large quantities of their stock to other retailers off-the-shelf, where it is cheaper for these retailers to pay £1 each for a bulk purchase than it would be to pay a discounted bulk-purchase rate elsewhere.
From 2016, Pep&Co clothing items were sold in Poundland branches, although at prices higher than the £1 single-price. Whilst some Pep and Co outlets would share store space with larger Poundland outlets, smaller stores feature a minimal clothing offering.

In 2018, Poundland announced that it will stop selling kitchen knives in all stores across the UK following a surge in knife attacks. As of July 2018, the ban has already taken effect in the London and West Midlands regions.

Customers
Poundland estimated it served 7 million customers per week in 2016, with most in the C1, C2, D and E categories although claimed in 2008 that 10% of their customers were in the A/B social grade groups, an increase of 22% compared to 2007. Poundland's typical appeal to low-income households is a reputation they are seeking to distance themselves from, as they expand into mainstream shopping centres and districts, with a focus on attracting higher earning consumers.

Corporate affairs

Competition

Since the acquisition of 99p Stores in 2015, Poundland's closest competitor was the now defunct Poundworld. Other competitors are discount retailers B&M, Home Bargains, Wilko and supermarkets.

Poundland may sometimes find they are competing with other retailers' own produce. It was reported in May 2010 that Poundland were selling rebranded lotions for £1, exactly the same product that Boots were selling under their own brand for significantly more. Boots responded to the findings by suggesting that the products available in Poundland stores were likely excess stock they had sold off below cost price which had been destined for overseas markets, with some directed into UK distribution without their permission.

Larger chains have felt the impact of discount retailers, with some customers switching from larger supermarket retailers for everyday necessities. To entice customers into their stores from larger supermarket chains, Poundland advertise familiar brands at competitive prices, with the hope customers may then be inclined to impulse buy other products such as own-brand that they otherwise would not have purchased. Asda reduced some branded product prices such as Colgate toothpaste to £1 in January 2009, in competition with Poundland who offered the same products at the £1 price; in response, Poundland introduced multi-buy offers to provide a larger quantity of the products for the same price. However, research conducted by The Grocer magazine in August 2009 found that of the 1300-odd supposedly discounted ASDA products, a third were the same price as in March 2008 and 173 products had been selling for less than £1 during Spring 2009.

Store expansion

From 2000 until 2003, company growth was steady with a milestone 100th store opening in Shirley, West Midlands in 2003, yet in the following three years, store numbers had increased by 50% to 150 by 2006. Growth slowed until early 2008 when Poundland took advantage of the economic downturn to further expand at an average rate of 3.7 stores a month, from February 2008 to September 2009, opening their 200th store during this time.

The retailer expanded into Northern Ireland and opened 6 stores before Christmas 2009, selling locally sourced goods such as milk as well as their usual branded products. Following the acquisition of 99p Stores, Poundland announced 80 stores were to close in November 2016, just 2 months after their takeover by Steinhoff International.

Financial performance
Poundland have seen increases in turnover year on year, helped by an increase of store openings and turbulent economic conditions in the mid-2000s. Where some high street shops reported a downturn in profits during the financial struggle, Poundland experienced growth attributed to rapid price inflation of numerous household necessities, including increased sales of toothpaste and tinned food.

International operations

Although price-point retailing and psychological pricing was first adopted in the United States during the 1870s by Frank Winfield Woolworth, the chain claims to have introduced this concept to Europe and in 2009, claimed to be the largest single-price discount retailer in Europe.

On 2 August 2011, Poundland announced plans to expand into mainland Europe under the name Dealz. The first 6 stores opened in Republic of Ireland in late 2011, creating 120 jobs and was followed by a store in the Isle of Man in December 2011. The name 'Euroland' was not used, due to poor feedback from potential customers.

Museum 
A Poundland museum has been created at Ludstone Hall, Claverley. The residence of Keith Smith father of Steve Smith who co-founded Poundland. This depicts the life of Steve Smith and his rise as market stall holder at Bilston Market to a multi-millionaire.

Criticism and litigation

Value for money
Although the £1 price once prevailed throughout the stores, some branded products have been known to be offered cheaper at supermarket chains, such as a case reported by the Daily Mirror newspaper in November 2009, which compared Poundland prices for branded products with the same products offered at supermarket stores and found in some cases the supermarkets offered better value. In 2019 25% of prices were over £1. By 2022 over half their prices were over £1.

Environmental concerns

In 2008, Poundland faced controversy by green campaigners over transporting Polo peppermints  into the UK from Indonesia, rather than sourcing the product locally and in spite of being close to the Nestle Rowntree's factory in York, which has made the mint since 1948. Poundland insisted it was cheaper for them to source the product from overseas, including transport costs; the mints were transported by ship, not by air, lessening the environmental impact to some degree.

Health and safety
Some products occasionally fail to meet health and safety standards and may pose a health threat to the consumer. Previous examples have included withdrawal of dangerous car jump leads in February 2006 found to only have a 3-ampere wire which, if used, could quickly overheat, melt and possibly catch fire, as well as recalling Halloween witch hats in October 2008, after checks revealed a small number of chemicals classified unsafe. In 2010, Poundland were fined £4,000 after a customer suffered injury due to a defective fishing catapult and in the same year fined £3,500 for selling lighters that produced a flame causing the device to melt during normal use.

In 2005, Poundland was fined £3,000 after being found of blocking fire exits, with a further breach in 2011 that incurred a fine of £20,000 and evacuation of a store due to poor fire safety.

Pest infestation
Poundland were fined £24,000 in June 2012 following an investigation of a store in Croydon, London. Council inspectors found poor hygiene, mouse infestation and food contaminated by mice chewing open the packaging and leaving droppings and urine inside, which were then re-sealed and sold to the public. Poundland admitted failing to withdraw food unfit for consumption, failing to control mice and failing to ensure the store was well maintained and clean. Additionally they admitted to failure to implement and maintain its own food safety management system.

In June 2015, Poundland were fined £10,000 following an investigation by Islington Council of a store in north London. Evidence of a widespread mouse infestation and that the company had failed to take appropriate action to remedy the situation was presented in court.

Remembrance poppies
In response to a news story about a member of staff being sent home for wearing a Remembrance poppy in October 2011, Poundland posted a comment on their Facebook and Twitter social media stating "Poundland is not against colleagues wearing a poppy; however, colleagues are not allowed to wear one on the shop-floor simply as it does not abide by the uniform rules." Poundland backed down from the ban on 31 October, and released the statement that employees will be allowed to "use their own discretion in wearing poppies" after hundreds of customers threatened to boycott the store.

Advertising and commercial campaigns
In December 2017, Poundland ran a social media campaign with a series of #ElfBehavingBad posts based on humour and double entendres. The Advertising Standards Authority received 85 complaints. The complaints were upheld and Poundland told not to show the posts in their current form again, as well as ensuring their adverts were presented with a sense of responsibility and did not cause offence.

See also
 Pep&Co
 Pound Shop Wars
 Variety store
 Warburg Pincus

References

External links

 Poundland's official website
 Poundland - Companies House #08861243
 

Arts and crafts retailers
Retail companies of the United Kingdom
Variety stores
Discount shops of the United Kingdom
Companies based in the West Midlands (county)
British companies established in 1990
Retail companies established in 1990
1990 establishments in the United Kingdom
Supermarkets of the United Kingdom
British brands